Walking on a Wire is a 2009 compilation CD set of songs by Richard Thompson. It was released on August 26, 2009, a set of four CDs. The set contains the bulk of Thompson's songs, but contains no unreleased material.

Track listing

Disc: 1

Time Will Show The Wiser - Fairport Convention  
Meet On The Ledge - Fairport Convention  
Genesis Hall - Fairport Convention  
Crazy Man Michael - Fairport Convention  
Sloth - Fairport Convention  
Roll Over Vaughn Williams  
Poor Ditching Boy
The Angels Took My Racehorse Away
The Great Valerio - Richard & Linda Thompson 
When I Get To The Border - Richard & Linda Thompson  
Withered And Died - Richard & Linda Thompson  
I Want To See The Bright Lights Tonight - Richard & Linda Thompson
Down Where The Drunkards Roll - Richard & Linda Thompson
Calvary Cross - Richard & Linda Thompson  
I'll Regret It All In The Morning - Richard & Linda Thompson
Old Man Inside A Young Man - Richard & Linda  Thompson  
For Shame Of Doing Wrong - Richard & Linda Thompson
Night Comes In - Richard & Linda Thompson

Disc: 2
Dimming Of The Day/Dargai - Richard & Linda Thompson
Heart Needs A Home, A - Richard & Linda Thompson
Don't Let A Thief Steal Into Your Heart - Richard & Linda Thompson
Strange Affair - Richard & Linda Thompson
Sunnyvista - Richard & Linda Thompson  
Sisters - Richard & Linda Thompson
Rockin' In Rhythm  
Did She Jump Or Was She Pushed - Richard & Linda Thompson
Man In Need - Richard & Linda Thompson
Shoot Out The Lights - Richard & Linda Thompson
Wall Of Death - Richard & Linda Thompson
Walking On A Wire - Richard & Linda Thompson  
Tear Stained Letter  
How I Wanted To  
Hand Of Kindness  
Beat The Retreat  
I Ain't Going To Drag My Feet No More

Disc: 3
Little Blue Number  
She Twists The Knife Again  
Valerie  
Turning Of The Tide  
I Still Dream  
Waltzing's For Dreamers  
Read About Love  
I Feel So Good  
I Misunderstood  
1952 Vincent Black Lightning  
Put Your Trust In Me  
From Galway To Graceland  
I Can't Wake Up To Save My Life  
MGB GT  
Mingus Eyes  
Beeswing  
Taking My Business Elsewhere  
King Of Bohemia  
Don't Roll Those Bloodshot Eyes At Me - with Danny Thompson
Razor Dance

Disc: 4
Hide It Away  
Last Shift - with Danny Thompson  
Big Chimney - with Danny Thompson
Lotteryland - with Danny Thompson  
Persuasion  
Cooksferry Queen  
Bathsheba Smiles  
Hard On Me  
Gethsemane  
A Love You Can't Survive
A Legal Matter
Grizzly Man  
Al Bowlly's In Heaven  
I'll Never Give It Up  
Dad's Gonna Kill Me  
She Sang Angels To Rest

Reception
Critical reception for the CD set was mixed to positive, with the majority of reviews praising Thompson's work as a whole while criticizing the lack of unreleased material. BBC Music and Pitchfork Media both echoed this sentiment, with Pitchfork Media remarking that it was "the closest thing Thompson's got to the career-spanning greatest-hits album he deserves-- but if you're not already part of his cult, it's more a moat than a drawbridge."

References

External links
 

Richard Thompson (musician) compilation albums
2009 compilation albums